Tzvi Erez (born 1968, Israel) is an Israeli–Canadian pianist. He was born in Israel and began his piano studies at the age of six. He moved to Canada and graduated from The Royal Conservatory of Music, where he trained with Mildred Kenton, Andrew Burashko, and Antonin Kubalek. Erez has released over 33 albums worldwide, including Bach's Well-Tempered Clavier, Partita 2, Goldberg Variations, Two-Part Inventions; Beethoven's Piano Works, Sonatas, Piano Concerto No. 3; Chopin's Complete Ballades, Etudes, Preludes, Piano Concertos No. 1 & 2; Debussy's Suite Bergamasque; Liszt Piano Recital; Erik Satie's Gymnopedies, Gnossiennes, and Cold Pieces; Mussorgsky's Pictures at an Exhibition; Essential Classics, Masterpieces, Sentimental, Mozart's Piano Sonatas, Rachmaninoff's Concerto No. 2 & 3, the Grieg Piano Concerto, the Robert Schumann Piano Concerto, the Tchaikovsky Piano Concerto, and others. Erez is active in new classical recordings, teaching piano performance and classical music research. He also assists artists in production and produced several film scores and music for television shows.

DISCOGRAPHY of Tzvi Erez

Mozart: Adagio from Piano Concerto No. 23, K488 (2022)

J.S. Bach: Concerto for Piano & Orchestra No. 5 in F Minor, BWV 1056 (2022)

J.S. Bach: Piano Concerto No. 1 in D Minor, BWV 1052 (2022)

Ludwig van Beethoven: Waldstein & Appassionata: Piano Sonatas No. 22 & 23 (2022)

Frederic Chopin: Complete Nocturnes (2021)

Frederic Chopin: Piano Concerto No. 2 in F Minor, Op. 21 (2021)

J.S. Bach: The Two-Part Inventions (BWV 772–786) (2020)

Frederic Chopin: Piano Concerto No. 1 in E Minor, Op. 11 (2020)

Frederic Chopin: Études (2020)

Bach/Marcello: Adagio BWV 974 (2020)

J.S. Bach: The Goldberg-Variations, BWV 988 (2020)

Beethoven 2020 (2020)

Sergei Rachmaninov: Piano Concerto No. 3 (2020)

Ludwig van Beethoven: Piano Concerto no. 3 in C Minor, Op. 37 (2019)

Frederic Chopin: CHOPIN: The Live Concert (2019)

Ludwig van Beethoven: Tzvi Erez Live at Glenn Gould Studio (2019)

Robert Schumann: Piano Concerto in A Minor, Op. 54 & Kinderszenen (2019)

Sergei Rachmaninov: Piano Concerto No. 2 (2017)

Edvard Grieg: Piano Concerto in A Minor (2017)

Frederic Chopin: Ballades, Polonaise & Nocturnes (2016)

Amor (2016)

Wolfgang Amadeus Mozart: The Piano Sonatas & Fantasie (2015)

Masterpieces (2015)

Claude Debussy: Spaces (2015)

George Gershwin: Tzvi Erez plays Rhapsody in Blue (2015)

J.S. Bach: Toccata and Fugue in D minor, BWV 565 (2014)

Essential Classics: The Piano & Orchestral Recordings (2014)

Ludwig van Beethoven: Piano Sonatas & 32 Variations on a Theme (2013)

Ludwig van Beethoven: The Last Piano Sonata, Opus 111 (2013)

Frederic Chopin: 24 Preludes, Opus 28 (2013)

Franz Liszt: Piano Recital (2013)

Erik Satie: Gymnopedies, Gnossiennes & Cold Pieces (2013)

Sentimental (2013)

Frederic Chopin: Nocturnes & Orchestrations (2012)

Frederic Chopin: The Etudes (2012)

J.S. Bach: Bach: Live in Concert (2012)

Claude Debussy: Suite Bergamasque (2012)

Mussorgsky: Pictures at an Exhibition (2012)

J.S. Bach: The Well-Tempered Clavier, Book 1, BWV 846-869 (2011)

J. S. Bach: Siciliano from Flute Concerto in B minor, BWV 1031 (2011)

J.S. Bach: The Goldberg-Variations, BWV 988 (2010)

J.S. Bach: Partita 2 in C Minor, BWV 826 (2010)

Frederic Chopin: Tzvi Erez plays Chopin (2003)

Ludwig van Beethoven: Beethoven Piano Works (2000)

References 

Canadian classical pianists
1968 births
Living people
Jewish Canadian musicians
Canadian people of Israeli descent
Israeli classical pianists
Israeli Jews
21st-century classical pianists